Gbagbo Laurent Junior Magbi (born 14 December 1993) is an Ivorian professional footballer who plays as a forward.

Club career 
On 23 October 2020, Magbi appeared for Wydad Casablanca in their 3–1 CAF Champions League semifinal loss to Egyptian side Al-Ahly.

Magbi signed a three-year deal with Wydad Casablanca, but the Moroccan club attempted to terminate his deal early. Magbi later joined Saudi Arabian club Al-Tai on a six-month loan. On 25 January 2022, Magbi joined Saudi Arabian club Jeddah.

References

1993 births
Living people
Ivorian footballers
Ivorian expatriate footballers
AS Tanda players
ASEC Mimosas players
Al-Ahly Shendi players
Damac FC players
Academie de Foot Amadou Diallo players
Wydad AC players
Al-Tai FC players
Jeddah Club players
Ligue 1 (Ivory Coast) players
Saudi First Division League players
Botola players
Expatriate footballers in Sudan
Ivorian expatriate sportspeople in Sudan
Expatriate footballers in Saudi Arabia
Ivorian expatriate sportspeople in Saudi Arabia
Expatriate footballers in Morocco
Ivorian expatriate sportspeople in Morocco
Association football forwards